Adam Drury may refer to:

 Adam Drury (footballer, born 1978), Retired English professional footballer active 1995–2014
 Adam Drury (footballer, born 1993), English professional footballer active 2007–present